Gordon James Millen (September 8, 1899 – April 10, 1948) was a politician from Toronto, Ontario, Canada. He served several years on city council before being elected as a Member of Provincial Parliament.

Background
Millen was a dentist by profession, and served in the First World War with the Canadian Army Dental Corps. In Toronto he set up a practice on Danforth Avenue and became involved in the local community. He served as president of the Danforth Business Association.

Politics
In 1932 he ran for city council but failed to get elected. He was finally successful in the 1937 election, winning a seat in Ward 1.
 
In 1945 he won the provincial Progressive Conservative nomination for the riding of Riverdale in a close contest against his fellow Ward 1 alderman Leslie Saunders. In the 1945 Ontario election Millen won the seat, defeating incumbent Leslie Wismer of the CCF.

Part way through his first term Millen fell ill and died in April 1948. The baseball stadium that then stood in Riverdale Park was named Millen Memorial Stadium in his honour.

References

External links

Progressive Conservative Party of Ontario MPPs
Toronto city councillors
1899 births
1948 deaths